Desire Caught by the Tail is the third  solo album by Adrian Belew, released in 1986. It is an instrumental record that was written, arranged and performed by Belew alone.

Unlike its predecessors Lone Rhino and Twang Bar King, Desire Caught By the Tail is an entirely experimental album. It was recorded using treated, multi-tracked electric guitars, guitar synthesizer, keyboards and assorted percussion instruments.

The title Desire Caught by the Tail is from the play 'Le Désir attrapé par la queue', written by Pablo Picasso. The album is in part inspired by Picasso, with both the sound and the composition style being more abstract, harsh and loosely structured than much of Belew's other solo repertoire.

Critical reception
The New York Times wrote that "by multitracking guitars and percussion, [Belew] can follow odder whims - inventing quasi-Middle Eastern folk melodies (and making his guitar sound like a musette), melting down tunes halfway through, piling up electronic yowls and twitters. Mr. Belew mixes eerie resonances and slapstick timing; even in instrumentals, his grin comes through."

Trivia
Belew reused a part of "Tango Zebra" as "Peace On Earth" on his 1994 album Here.

Track listing
All tracks written and arranged by Adrian Belew.

 "Tango Zebra" – 7:30
 "Laughing Man" – 5:28
 "The Gypsy Zurna" – 3:03
 "Portrait of Margaret" – 4:00
 "Beach Creatures Dancing Like Cranes" – 3:28
 "At the Seaside Café" – 1:50
 "Guernica" – 2:00
 ""Z"" – 5:40

Personnel
 Adrian Belew – guitar, Roland GR-700 guitar synthesizer, pedals, assorted percussions

Technical
 Stan Hertzman – executive producer
 Rich Denhart – engineer
 Jim Bartz – assistant engineer
 Ted Jensen at Sterling Sound, NYC – mastering
 Bruce Breckenfeld – technician
 Paul Hixson – photography (front cover)
 Chris Covatta – photography (back cover)
 Margaret Belew – paintings
 Sotto Vocé – cover design

References 

1986 albums
Adrian Belew albums
Albums produced by Adrian Belew
Island Records albums